Nicomachus (c. 60 – c. 120) was a mathematician and Pythagorean philosopher from Gerasa.

Nicomachus may also refer to:
Nicomachus (mythology)
Nicomachus (scribe) (c. 410 BC), scribe tasked with publishing the laws of Solon
Nicomachus of Thebes (4th century BC), ancient Greek painter
Nicomachus (father of Aristotle) (c. 375 BC), father of the philosopher Aristotle
Nicomachus (son of Aristotle) (c. 325 BC), son of the philosopher Aristotle
Nicomachus of Macedon, eromenos of Dimnus, conspirator against Alexander the Great
Appius Nicomachus Dexter, politician of the Western Roman Empire
Gaius Asinius Nicomachus Julianus (born c. 185), Proconsul in Asia in the 3rd century
Rufius Petronius Nicomachus Cethegus  (politician of Ostrogothic Italy and the Eastern Roman Empire

See also
 Nicomachus Flavianus (disambiguation)
 Nicomachus theorem
 Nicomachean Ethics
 Nichomachus